Jim Piddock (born April 8, 1956) is an English actor, producer and writer who began his career on the stage in the United Kingdom before emigrating to the United States in 1981.

Personal life
Piddock was born on April 8, 1956, in Rochester, Kent, the son of Celia Mary (née O'Callaghan) and Charles Frederick Piddock.

Career
Piddock began his acting career on the stage in the UK before emigrating to the US in his early twenties. He made his US theatrical debut in a one-man show, The Boy's Own Story, in 1982. He also appeared in Lethal Weapon 2, Independence Day, The Prestige, Austin Powers in Goldmember, The Five-Year Engagement, Think Like a Man Too, and several Christopher Guest films, including Best in Show and A Mighty Wind.

Stage career
Piddock made his theatrical debut in the US in The Boy's Own Story, a one-man show about a football goalkeeper, at the Julian Theatre in San Francisco. That same year (1982), he was cast in Noël Coward's Present Laughter, and other Broadway and Off-Broadway shows followed, including the original US production of Noises Off, The Knack at the Roundabout Theatre, Make and Break, and Design For Living.

I spent the first few years of my career pretty much doing nothing but stage work. I started in rep companies in England then did a one-man show in the US which led very quickly to doing several Broadway shows. I got very lucky early on. They were fun shows to do. I was in the first ever production of Noises Off in America and my first ever job in New York was being directed by and appearing with George C. Scott.

In November 2007, he appeared at the Ricardo Montalbán Theatre in Hollywood, starring on stage in a production of What About Dick? alongside an all British expat cast, including Billy Connolly, Tim Curry, Eric Idle, Eddie Izzard, Jane Leeves, Emily Mortimer and Tracey Ullman. When the play officially premiered in 2012, with the addition of Russell Brand, he was again in the cast. He also appeared in 2009 at the Montalban Theatre and on Broadway in An Evening Without Monty Python.

Film and television career

Of his transition into television, Piddock said:

I'd always wanted to end up working in film and TV. I guess I could have stayed in New York and probably had a long and fruitful career in the theatre but in the mid-1980s I felt like it was time to change gears and I'd certainly not been short-changed in terms of getting to perform live.

He has appeared in close to a hundred TV shows, including The Haunting of Bly Manor, Modern Family, A Confession, Designated Survivor, Get Shorty, Training Day, Mom, Childrens Hospital, The Royals, Touch, Two and a Half Men, Castle, ER, Law & Order: LA, Party Down, Chuck, Dollhouse, Without a Trace, Monk, Lost, Crossing Jordan, Citizen Baines, Friends, Yes, Dear, Angel, The Geena Davis Show, Murder She Wrote, Coach, Tour of Duty, Max Headroom, and The Twilight Zone.
He has also appeared in several TV films and mini-series, including From The Earth to the Moon, A Mom for Christmas, She Creature on HBO, and The Women of Windsor. He also created, wrote and produced the BBC series Too Much Sun.

His film appearances include Get Him to the Greek, Woody Allen's You Will Meet a Tall Dark Stranger. Falling Up, The Seeker: The Dark Is Rising, Who's Your Caddy?, Epic Movie, Meet the Spartans, The Prestige, Love for Rent, A Different Loyalty, See This Movie, Austin Powers in Goldmember, Multiplicity, Independence Day, Traces of Red, and Lethal Weapon 2.  
He also appeared in the Christopher Guest comedies Best in Show as the Dog Show commentator with Fred Willard, A Mighty Wind, For Your Consideration, and Mascots, the last of which he co-wrote and produced.

Voice work
As a voice actor, Piddock provided the voice of Major Zero in the English version of the video game Metal Gear Solid 3: Snake Eater as well as Agent One in Return to Castle Wolfenstein for Xbox and PlayStation 2. In film he provided the voice of Bolero the Bull in the film Garfield 2 and of Kenneth Loring, the fictional artistic director of Forever Young Films, in the commentary of the directors' cut of the Coen brothers' Blood Simple. He also voiced the part of King Mufasa's hornbill majordomo, Zazu in the Disney games Timon & Pumbaa's Jungle Games and The Lion King: Simba's Mighty Adventure, Batman's butler, Alfred Pennyworth, in the DC Comics animated film Batman: Under the Red Hood, and voiced Chic for the animated science fiction film Dead Space: Downfall, based on the video game Dead Space.

Later work
Piddock appeared in 2012's The Five-Year Engagement, which starred Jason Segel and Emily Blunt, playing Blunt's father, The Cold Light of Day starring Henry Cavill, Bruce Willis and Sigourney Weaver, 1915, Kill Your Friends, and The Dictator with Sacha Baron Cohen.

In August 2012, it was announced that Piddock would be co-writing, acting, and producing a new TV comedy series with Christopher Guest for HBO and the BBC titled Family Tree. The show subsequently aired in 2013.

On 13 October 2016, Mascots, which he also co-wrote with Guest, stars in, and produced, premiered on Netflix. Since then he has appeared in several television shows, including Modern Family, Designated Survivor, Get Shorty, Training Day, Blunt Talk, and The Royals.

In 2021, he played Captain Carradine in the film The Queen Mary, which was shot in the UK and the US and is due to be released in 2022.

Writing and producing
Piddock wrote the story for and produced Tooth Fairy in 2010, New Line's action-comedy The Man, One Good Turn, Traces of Red, and the Cold War romantic thriller A Different Loyalty starring Rupert Everett and Sharon Stone, and which Piddock played a supporting role in.

In November 2019, it was announced that his screenplay Frankel would begin shooting in 2022 with Jeremy Irons playing the lead role of Sir Henry Cecil.

Author

His light-hearted and irreverent memoir, CAUGHT WITH MY PANTS DOWN and Other Tales from a Life in Hollywood, chronicling his four decades in the entertainment industry, is being released on March 23, 2022, in paperback, ebook, and audiobook formats.
British comedian, actor, and writer, Russell Brand said of the book: "Jim has done that rare thing that perhaps only Michael Caine and David Niven have done before; conjured a funny, inclusive, whimsical, and magical tale." American actress Jean Smart wrote: "This laugh-out-loud book... entertains endlessly and most wisely". And British actor Hugh Bonneville described it as "hilarious, passionate, beautifully told, and memorably waspish."

Filmography

Film

Television

Video games

References

External links
General
 
 
Interviews
 "Culture: The Seeker Interview"
 "Straight2DVD Interview"
 "GeekWeek Tooth Fairy Interview"

1956 births
Living people
20th-century English male actors
21st-century English male actors
English expatriates in the United States
English male film actors
English male television actors
English male voice actors
English people of Irish descent
English Roman Catholics
Male actors from Kent
People educated at Worth School
People from Rochester, Kent